Andrea Carolina Rosales Castillejos (born November 28, 1991) is a Venezuelan model and beauty pageant titleholder who won Miss Venezuela Earth 2015 and represented Venezuela in Miss Earth 2015.

Career
Andrea is a model.

May 28, 2016 she was guest judge in the final of Mister Venezuela 2016 pageant, realized in Estudio 1, Venevision.

Miss Venezuela 2015
On October 8, 2015, during the final telecast Andrea was crowned Miss Venezuela Earth 2015. She becomes the Venezuela's representative for Miss Earth. Rosales won together with Mariam Habach for Miss Universe and Jessica Duarte for Miss International. The pageant was held on October 8, 2015, at Estudio 1, Venevisión in Caracas.

During the finals night, Andrea also won the "Miss Cabello Radiante (Most Beautiful Hair)" award.

Miss Earth 2015

Being the winner of Miss Earth Venezuela 2015, Andrea has become Venezuela's representative at the Miss Earth 2015 and would try to succeed Jamie Herrell as the next Miss Earth.

As a Miss Earth delegate, an advocacy is a must. When she was asked about her advocacy as Miss Earth, she answered via Miss Earth official website, "Whenever I am in public places I use to collect the garbage thrown by other people, I like to collaborate in this way with the environment to keep the areas clean and avoid pollution. Also I try to recycle at home."

See also
 Miss Venezuela 2015

References

External links
Andrea Rosales at Miss Earth official website
Miss Venezuela Official Website

1991 births
Living people
Venezuelan beauty pageant winners
Miss Earth 2015 contestants
People from Maracay